"Think Before I Talk" is a song by Norwegian singer Astrid S, released on 25 August 2017 through Island Records and Universal Music. It was written by Andrew Cedar, Madison Love and Scott Harris. It reached number one in Norway, as well as the top 10 in Denmark and the top 20 in Sweden. The song was later included on the complete edition of her debut studio album Leave It Beautiful.

Background
Astrid S explained that the song is about "saying things you don't mean because you are hurt, frustrated or maybe angry" and the "ensuing regret".

Critical reception
Robin Murray of Clash said the song expresses regret "in the sweetest way possible" and is "superbly uplifting, with the vocal veering between two poles of indignation and soft resignation".

Charts

Certifications

References

2017 singles
2017 songs
Astrid S songs
Songs written by Madison Love
Songs written by Scott Harris (songwriter)